Maria Dmitrievna Cantemirovna (1700–1754) was a Romanian noblewoman, Princess of Moldavia, a lady in waiting and  salonist, and a mistress of Peter the Great, the Emperor of Russia.

Early life 
Maria, born in Iași as the eldest daughter of the Dimitrie Cantemir, Prince of Moldavia and his first wife, Princess Kassandra Cantacuzene (1682–1713). By birth, she was member of the House of Cantemir.

Biography 
From an early age, she received an excellent education. From 1711 she lived in exile in  Russia, and in 1720, she became involved in a relationship with Tsar Peter. Maria followed Peter to Astrakhan in 1722, where she gave birth to a son by him. The child died in 1723, possibly poisoned by the physician of  Empress Catherine. 

Catherine regarded Maria as a threat and feared that Maria might replace her as empress. The relationship with Peter continued until his death in January 1725, when Catherine became Empress regnant and Maria was forced to leave court. She was a lady in waiting to  princess Natalia in 1727–28 and to Empress Anna Ivanovna in 1730–31. Later she hosted a literary salon in Saint Petersburg.

The Swedish slave Lovisa von Burghausen mentions Maria in her autobiography. Burghausen, as the prisoner of Dimitrie Cantemir in 1713-1714, credited Maria and her sister Smaragda Catarina with saving her from freezing to death during a punishment by allowing her to sleep in their bedroom instead of in an unheated stone room in the middle of winter.

References 

Mistresses of Peter the Great
Ladies-in-waiting from the Russian Empire
Salon holders from the Russian Empire
1700 births
1754 deaths
Emigrants from the Ottoman Empire to the Tsardom of Russia
18th-century women from the Russian Empire
18th-century Romanian women